Jasmin Farid (born 1992) is a Swedish Moderate Party politician who has been a Member of the Riksdag since 2022.

See also 

 List of members of the Riksdag, 2018–2022

References 

Living people

1992 births
Members of the Riksdag from the Moderate Party
21st-century Swedish women politicians
21st-century Swedish politicians
Women members of the Riksdag
Members of the Riksdag 2018–2022
Politicians from Stockholm